Suillus mediterraneensis is a species of edible mushroom in the genus Suillus. It is found in Europe within Coniferous forests, mycorrhizal with two-needled pines (Pinus halepensis, P. pinea, P. pinaster). Originally named Boletus mediterraneensis in 1969, It was transferred to Suillus in 1992. It is similar to Suillus granulatus, but is distinguished by yellowish and not white flesh.

References

External links

mediterraneensis
Edible fungi
Fungi described in 1969
Fungi of Europe